In population genetics, the Wahlund effect is a reduction of heterozygosity (that is when an organism has two different alleles at a locus) in a population caused by subpopulation structure. Namely, if two or more subpopulations are in a Hardy–Weinberg equilibrium but have different allele frequencies, the overall heterozygosity is reduced compared to if the whole population was in equilibrium. The underlying causes of this population subdivision could be geographic barriers to gene flow followed by genetic drift in the subpopulations.

The Wahlund effect was first described by the Swedish geneticist Sten Wahlund in 1928.

Simplest example 
Then, there are no heterozygotes, even though the subpopulations are in a Hardy–Weinberg equilibrium.

Case of two alleles and two subpopulations 

Let the allele frequency in each population be different, i.e. .

Suppose each population is in an internal Hardy–Weinberg equilibrium, so that the genotype frequencies AA, Aa and aa are p2, 2pq, and q2 respectively for each population.

Then the heterozygosity in the overall population is given by the mean of the two:

 

which is always smaller than  unless

Generalization 

The Wahlund effect may be generalized to different subpopulations of different sizes.  The heterozygosity of the total population is then given by the mean of the heterozygosities of the subpopulations, weighted by the subpopulation size.

F-statistics 
The reduction in heterozygosity can be measured using F-statistics.

See also
 Cryptic relatedness

References 

Population genetics